Carcha violalis is a species of snout moth in the genus Carcha. It was described by George Hampson in 1897 and is known from Brazil (it was described from Espírito Santo)

References

Moths described in 1897
Chrysauginae